The Bluesat project is an engineering project being undertaken by undergraduate students at the University of New South Wales.  It aims to raise awareness of space and give students the opportunity to undertake space engineering projects.

Current projects include an attitude control system for the Waratah Seed project and a CubeSat design for the Japanese Satellite Design Competition (Satcon).

Past projects
Bluesat's ground station team is assisted in ACSER's ECO360 satellite and built a number of system in that satellite.

Bluesat's Off-World Robotics team was involved in several rover platform designs for various satellite competitions. OWR's project BLUEtounge came 16th out of 40 in the European Rover Challenge 2015, 9th at the 2016 iteration of the challenge and 8th in the 2018 iteration.

In 2019 Bluesat collaborated with Biosphere UNSW and AIAA Rocketry UNSW to launch a 2U CubeSat on a rocket for the THUNDA 2019 rocket launch competition. The ADCS team also designed a detumble system for the rocket however it was not tested in that project. However their design is kept for future projects.

Bluesat also undertook work stratospheric balloons.

Current executives
 Andrew Nicholson - President
 Matthew Rossouw - Vice president
Jimmy Chen - Secretary
 Bilegsaikhan (Bilgee) Turbadrakh - Chief technical officer
 David Huang - Treasurer

Competition results

References

External links
 Bluesat project website

Amateur radio satellites
University of New South Wales student organisations
Rover Challenge Series